Lagenaria breviflora is a species of flowering plant. It is a climbing vine that is found across Central, East, and West Africa. It has large, 7 to 20 cm ovate-triangular leaves with hairy undersides and partly-dense hairs on the leaf petioles. It grows vine branches up to 6 meters long. It forms ~9x7 cm oblong, green fruits with whitish spots across the surface. The fruits are similar to those of other members of the Lagenaria genus.

References

Cucurbitoideae
Flora of Africa